This is a list of fictional monarchs – characters who appear in fiction as the monarchs (kings, queens, emperors, empresses, etc.) of real-life countries. They are listed by country, then according to the production or story in which they appeared.

A

Austria-Hungary

The Illusionist
 Crown Prince Leopold is the powerful and influential heir to the throne of the Austro-Hungarian Empire in the 2006 film The Illusionist, although his father, the Emperor, is the actual reigning monarch.

A Scandal in Bohemia by Sir Arthur Conan Doyle
 Wilhelm Gottsreich Sigismond von Ormstein - The Grand Duke of Cassel-Felstein and the hereditary King of Bohemia, he approaches Sherlock Holmes and Dr. Watson about the retrieval of letters and photographs confirming a liaison with Irene Adler in order to secure his engagement to Clotilde Lothma Von Saxe-Meiningen, a young Scandinavian princess. (The story fictionally assumes that Bohemia was ruled by its own Habsburg branch, rather than the actual situation of its being part of the domains of the Austro-Hungarian Emperor). There is also mentioned a "King of Scandinavia", a title which never existed in reality as the Scandinavian countries never united into a single realm.

B

Brazil

Time for the Stars by Robert A. Heinlein
 Emperor Dom Pedro III greets the protagonists as they return to Earth after a centuries-long galactic voyage, presenting them with a medal on behalf of the World Government.

The Peshawar Lancers by S. M. Stirling
 In the novel, Dom Pedro is mentioned as ruler of the Dominion of Braganza, the shadowy post-Fall successor to the Empire of Brazil ruled by a caudillo of the month.

Books by Harry Turtledove
 Dom Pedro IV: In the Southern Victory series, he is the Emperor of Brazil during the First Great War, leading the country into war on the side of the Central Powers, cutting off supply lines between the Allied countries of Argentina and Britain and hastening the end of the war. Pedro IV's lineage and the status of slavery in Brazil are not addressed, whilst the continued existence of the Brazilian Empire may be an indirect consequence of Confederate independence.
 In Curious Notions of the Crosstime Traffic series, Imperial Germany is victorious in the 20th century's three world wars, becoming the dominant world power by 2096. This results in Germany restoring the monarchies of numerous countries including Brazil. The unnamed Emperor of Brazil is among the numerous monarchs who attend the Kaiser in Berlin in a glittering annual ceremony broadcast live worldwide.

Bulgaria

In the Presence of Mine Enemies by Harry Turtledove
 During Horst Witzleben’s Seven O’Clock News, an unnamed Tsar of Bulgaria is reported as welcoming the Poglavnik of Croatia during a state visit. The unnamed Tsar is also one of many fascist puppet or sympathising heads of state to commiserate the death of the German Führer, Kurt Haldweim.

Year of the Rabbit
 Prince Hector, the heir to the Bulgarian throne, attends Balkan peace talks in London but is kidnapped whilst under the protection of Detective Inspector Eli Rabbit and his team. His sister, Princess Juliana, is revealed to be the perpetrator of the kidnapping, wanting the Bulgarian throne for herself. She is also an expert sharpshooter and a member of the secret organisation, 'the Vision'.

C

China and the Greater Chinese Empire

Curse of the Golden Flower
Emperor Ping is the imperial ruler of the Tang dynasty and the father of Princes Wan, Jai and Yu, who is in the place of Puyuan and takes Princess Phoenix to be his Empress in the 2006 Chinese film Curse of the Golden Flower.

Mulan
An unnamed Emperor is the wise, old ruler of China who makes Fa Mulan an honorary heroine for saving his empire from the Huns. He is based on the real-life Emperor Qin Shi Huang in Disney's animated film Mulan and its live-action remake, which based on the legendary folklore about Hua Mulan.

War of the Worlds: Global Dispatches
In the story "Foreign Devils" by Walter Jon Williams, the Martians of H.G. Wells's War of The Worlds land in China, destroy Beijing and cause widespread death and destruction throughout the country, but the Guangxu Emperor survives by fleeing to a faraway province. In the aftermath the Emperor - whose plans for reform were foiled in actual history - takes advantage of the chaos to stage a bloody coup and establish himself strongly in power. He then the uses the disarray of European powers, still recovering from the Martian invasion of their home territories, to shake off colonial tutlelage and make China a  world power 50 years ahead of schedule. China in this history will remain a monarchy, there will be no Chinese Republic nor a Communist Chinese regime, and there will be many more new Emperors from among the progeny of the Guangxu Emperor.

D

Denmark

Hamlet by William Shakespeare
 King Hamlet was the previous monarch of Denmark and the father of Prince Hamlet. His ghost appears at night and beckons his living son to follow his instructions. He is loosely based on Horwendill, the legendary Jutish chieftain.
 King Claudius murdered his brother King Hamlet to become the new monarch of Denmark and to be married to Queen Gertrude, Prince Hamlet's mother. He is loosely based on the Jutish chieftain Feng.

The Prince & Me
 Haraald, the former King of Denmark in the film The Prince & Me and its sequel The Prince & Me 2: The Royal Wedding.
 Edvard III, Haraald's son, becomes the King of Denmark with Paige Morgan as his Queen.

F

Finland

King Ralph
 King Gustav
 He and the Finnish royal family visit the United Kingdom shortly after King Ralph's accession to the British throne. The purpose of the visit is to arrange a royal marriage between Ralph and Princess Anna of Finland and to negotiate the purchasing of off-shore drilling equipment following the discovery of oil reserves in the Baltic Sea. The arranged marriage is called off after King Gustav is given photographs showing Ralph with Miranda, an exotic dancer.

France

Bring the Jubilee by Ward Moore
 Napoleon VI
 He is mentioned as the Emperor of France reigning sometime around the 1930s with his scandalous personal life being gossiped about in American publications.

Mickey, Donald, Goofy: The Three Musketeers
 Minnie Mouse portrays the role of a princess who rules the Kingdom of France but is also a victim of being overthrown by the villainous Pete in Disney's 2004 direct-to-video animated film Mickey, Donald, Goofy: The Three Musketeers. (see Princess and dragon)

Monty Python’s Flying Circus
 In the episode "The Golden Age Of Ballooning", a Scottish conman (played by Michael Palin) poses as the French monarch, claiming to be Louis XIV, Louis XV, Louis XVI and Louis XVII.

The Peshawar Lancers by S. M. Stirling
 Napoleon VI is mentioned as the Emperor of France-outre-mer in an alternate 2025 where, in 1878, a meteor shower known as 'The Fall' rendered the Northern Hemisphere uninhabitable, forcing European metropolitan governments to evacuate to their colonies. France-outre-mer encompasses French North Africa and reclaimed French, Spanish and Portuguese coastal territories, with its capital based in Algiers. King-Emperor John II arranges the marriage of his daughter Sita to the heir to the throne of France-outre-mer, partly to establish an Anglo-French condominium over the Sultanate of Egypt and re-open the Suez Canal.

The Rose of Versailles
 Louis XV was the previous King of France. He died of smallpox inside the Palace of Versailles before his people celebrated the birth of a new kingdom. And after his death, his lover Madame du Barry has taken a convent where she remained until she was guillotined.
 Louis XVI, the Dauphin, becomes the new King of France with his wife, the former princess Marie Antoinette, as its Queen after his grandfather's death but has been captured with his royal family during the French Revolution. He has been in jail and is later executed, including his family. His son, Louis Joseph, was the heir apparent who admired the female soldier, Oscar François de Jarjayes, and wanted to be the King of France so that he would make the country great, but died of illness at the age of seven.

The Short Reign of Pippin IV by John Steinbeck
 Pippin Arnulf Héristal, a descendant of Charlemagne, is crowned as Pippin IV to provoke a rebellion.

Southern Victory Series by Harry Turtledove
 Charles XI
 After France's defeat during the First Great War, he becomes king of France between the late 1920s and 1930 after Action Française takes control of the country, ends the French Third Republic, and restores the monarchy. He serves as the King of France for fourteen years and leads his country into another war with the German Empire after the new Kaiser Wilhelm III refuses to return Alsace-Lorraine to France. He is later killed in 1944 when Germany destroys most of Paris with an atomic bomb.
 Louis XIX
 Following Charles XI's death, he is succeeded by Louis XIX. While he initially announced France's intention to continue to fight Germany, he ultimately accepts capitulation.

To Kill Napoleon, Whatever the Cost by Elizabeth Williams
 Napoleon VI is the French Emperor in 1973 in an alternate timeline where Napoleon I imposed a crushing defeat on Britain in 1807.

The Two Georges by Richard Dreyfuss and Harry Turtledove
 François IV is mentioned as being the King of the Holy Alliance, a union of the French and Spanish Empires and the British Empire's main rival.

The Virgin & the Wheels by L. Sprague de Camp
 Napoleon V
 Emperor of the French in an alternate universe in which New York City was seemingly under Bonpartist occupation enforced by looting Spanish soldiers.

Through Darkest Europe by Harry Turtledove
 Jean XXIII is mentioned as the King of France in an alternate reality where Islamic North Africa and the Middle East constituted the modern, liberal First World, and Europe was a backward hotspot of Christian fundamentalist terrorism. Reigning during the fifteenth century AH, his son the Dauphin is hospitalised during an Aquinist attack on the funeral of Grand Duke Cosimo III of Italy.

G

Germany

Archduke Franz Ferdinand Lives! by Richard Ned Lebow
 As a result of Archduke Franz Ferdinand never being assassinated, neither of the world wars occur. Germany remains a monarchy into the twenty-first century, with the unnamed Kaiser's niece Princess Elizabetha (named for Elizabeth II) being engaged to be married to Prince Harry.

The Shape of Things to Come by H. G. Wells
 Prince Manfred of Bavaria is the leader of a worldwide rebellion against a nascent world government sometime during the late twentieth century.

Books by Harry Turtledove
 Wilhelm II  remains on the German throne beyond 1918 as a result of a Central Powers victory during analogues of the First World War in Curious Notions and the Southern Victory series.
 Wilhelm III (or Friedrich I of Germany and Friedrich Wilhelm V of Prussia)
 In the Southern Victory series, he refuses to return Alsace-Lorraine to the new Kingdom of France, which acts as the casus belli for the Second Great War in Europe, during the course of which he authorizes the atomic bombings of London, Norwich, Brighton, Paris and Petrograd.
 In Curious Notions, he leads Germany during an analogue of the Second World War in the late 1930s, resulting in Germany becoming the dominant power in Europe.
 Wilhelm IV: In Curious Notions, he leads Germany during the Third World War circa 1956, during which numerous cities across the United States were devastated in nuclear blasts (San Francisco only being spared due to a German nuclear bomber plane being shot down). A bronze statue of him is mentioned as being situated outside of the San Francisco City Hall.

The Gate of Time by Philip José Farmer
 Wilhelm IV leads an expansionist, imperialist Germany in his timeline's version of the Second World War.

Greece

If It Had Happened Otherwise edited by J. C. Squire
 George I – In Harold Nicolson's short story If Byron Had Become King of Greece, Lord Byron survives his illness in 1824, becomes the chief military strategist in the Greek War of Independence against the Ottoman Empire and is crowned King in the 1830s.

H

Hawaii

Days of Infamy by Harry Turtledove
 Stanley Owana Laanui and Cynthia Laanui – In the Days of Infamy series, set in an alternate timeline where Japan not only attacked Pearl Harbor but also fully occupied the Hawaiian Islands, Laanui (an obscure but fictional member of the former Hawaiian Royal Family) is installed as a puppet 'King of Hawaii'. He chooses Cynthia Laanui to be his consort.

I

India

Charlie and the Chocolate Factory by Roald Dahl
Prince Pondicherry wants to rule India in his own chocolate palace, rejecting Willy Wonka's warning to eat it all before it melts. But despite his insistence, the prince's chocolate palace later melts on the hot sunny day. His name derives from the city of Pondicherry.

The Jungle Book
 King Louie is an orangutan and the leader of the Bandar-log tribe, who acts like the monkey king of the Ancient Ruins and attempts to gain knowledge of fire from the "man-cub", Mowgli, to be more like a human. He is inspired by his voice actor, American jazz singer Louis Prima. In the live-action remake, Louie is a Gigantopithecus.

Iran/Persia

Books by Harry Turtledove
 In the Crosstime Traffic series, an unnamed Shah is mentioned as being the ruler of Iran in the 2092 of the 'home timeline', operating a police state. The restored Iranian monarchy may have been the result of several 'Iran Interventions' mentioned in The Disunited States of America.

Prince of Persia: The Sands of Time
 King Sharaman is the monarch of Persia, the father of Princes Tus and Garsiv and the adoptive father of Dastan in Disney's 2010 film which based on the video game of the same name.

Iraq

Iznogoud
 Haroun El Poussah is a benevolent and benign caliph of Baghdad whose Iznogoud serves as his grand vizier and who only cares about sleeping, eating and having lazy fun. His name is a pun on the historical Caliph Harūn al-Rashīd.

The Thief and the Cobbler
 King Nod is the sleepy ruler of Baghdad (also known as the Golden City), the father of Princess Yum-Yum and father-in-law of Tack the Cobbler.

Italy

The Alteration by Kingsley Amis
 In the alternate 1976 depicted in the novel, amongst the numerous crowned heads of Europe attending the funeral of Stephen III of England is an unspecified King of Naples, the ascendency of the Catholic Church as a secular power preventing the unification of Italy.

Books by Harry Turtledove
 Umberto III – In the alternate 2010 depicted in In the Presence of Mine Enemies, Italy (like Spain and Portugal) is an ally of the Greater German Reich and possesses its own empire but is compelled to carry out racial policies such as the extermination of Arabs in its territories. The Italian King is a figurehead but does hold influence in domestic politics.
 Cosimo III - In the alternate timeline depicted in Through Darkest Europe, due to the adoption by Thomas Aquinas and Al-Ghazali of opposite positions regarding the compatibility of reason and religion than in real-life, Islamic North Africa and the Middle East are the "liberal, tolerant, and above all rich" First World whilst Christian Europe is an impoverished hotspot of Christian fundamentalist terrorism. By the alternate fifteenth century AH, Cosimo is the Grand Duke of Italy (except for Sicily, which is still under Maghrebi control) and is regarded as a strongman. He is killed by an Aquinist suicide bomber.
 Lorenzo III - Grand Duke of Italy in Through Darkest Europe, he succeeded his father Cosimo III.

Romeo and Juliet by William Shakespeare
 Prince Escalus is the reigning prince of Verona. He is possibly based on Bartolomeo I of the Scaliger family.

The Tempest by William Shakespeare
 King Alonso is the monarch of Naples and the father of Prince Ferdinand.

J

Japan and the Greater Japanese Empire

The Tale of Genji by Murasaki Shikibu

Emperor Suzaku [ja], the Kiritsubo emperor's son and immediate successor
Emperor Reizei [ja], Suzaku's successor and supposedly also a son of the Kiritsubo emperor but secretly a son of the protagonist, Hikaru Genji

The Peshawar Lancers by S. M. Stirling
In this novel, Akahito is the Emperor of Dai-Nippon (Greater Japan) in 2025. Dai-Nippon, with its capital based in Peking, encompasses Japan, China, Korea, the Philippines, most of Southeast Asia and coastal colonies in Siberia and Alaska. Regarding the Fall as beneficial, Dai-Nippon rivals the Angrezi Raj.

Books by Harry Turtledove
 In In the Presence of Mine Enemies, set in an alternate timeline where the Axis Powers won the Second World War, an unnamed Emperor of Manchukuo (a subordinate ruler within the Japanese Greater East Asia Sphere of Co-Prosperity) is one of many heads of state who commiserate the death of the Führer, Kurt Haldweim.
 In Joe Steele, Japan surrenders to the Americans in the South and the Soviets in the North. The U.S. establishes the Constitutional Monarchy of Japan. However, with Emperor Hirohito being killed during an air raid towards the end of the war, Hirohito's 12-year-old son Akihito becomes the new emperor, although he is only a figure head, as it is General Dwight D. Eisenhower who really runs the country.

L

Liechtenstein

Cabin Pressure
King Maximilian - In the episode "Vaduz", the crew of MJN Air are hired to fly King Maximilian (played by Kieran Hodgson) to Fitton. Unbeknownst to them, however, is the fact that Maximilian is a young boy, the posthumous and only son of the previous King, preceded by six older sisters with the eldest, Princess Theresa (played by Matilda Ziegler) acting as Regent. Having become King at such a young age, Maxi constantly flouts his title and power for trivial reasons which his pilot, Captain Martin Crieff, says would not make him popular in the long-term (based on his own experiences). After Princess Theresa covers for Crieff for accidentally ordering too much fuel, the two begin dating.

Lithuania

Gunpowder Empire by Harry Turtledove

King Kuzmickas 
In this alternate history, the Roman Empire never fell and remained strong and powerful to the end the 21st century and beyond, eventually gaining firearms and developing a technology roughly similar to our 17th century. Eventually, the rival Lietuvan Empire developed to its north and east (roughly similar to the Polish–Lithuanian Commonwealth). The two evenly matched empires were in permanent cold war, sometimes turning hot. One such occasion was when King Kuzmickas of Lietuva mobilised his army and tried to conquer the city of Polisso, capital of the Roman province of Dacia. He placed the city under siege and came very close to capturing it, but in the end had to withdraw. The ceasefire was worked out by a young Roman emissary Ieremeo Soltero whose eloquence impressed the king.

M

Madagascar

Madagascar
 King Julien XII (also known as Uncle King Julien) 
 He is a strict, lazy, paunchy and cowardly old ring-tailed lemur who was the previous ruler of the Lemur Kingdom in the island of Madagascar in the Netflix animated series All Hail King Julien. He has been told by Masikura the panther chameleon that he would get eaten by the foosa, although the prophecy did not say that all of him would be bit. So he left his island and abdicated the throne in favor of his nephew, who became King Julien XIII of Madagascar. However, the original King Julien became devious as he returned to the island and tried to reclaim the throne from his nephew. In the end, he decided to give up his evil plans and start a new and better life.
 King Julien XIII
 He is the Indian-accented ring-tailed lemur who has been a ruler of the Lemur Kingdom in Madagascar after his uncle's abdication, using mostly his delegation and charisma, and loves to throw a party with his subjects. In All Hail King Julien, Julien has been against not only his uncle but also his parents Princess Julienne and Prince Barty. He has his own royal advisor Maurice the aye-aye and befriends Mort the mouse lemur and four zoo animals, Alex the lion, Marty the zebra, Melman the giraffe and Gloria the hippo, from New York City. Julien even has his position passed down to Stevie, the leaf-tailed gecko who forms part of his crown.

Mexico

The Alteration by Kingsley Amis
 An unnamed Emperor of Mexico is mentioned in conversation between the castrati Mirabilis and Viaventosa. The nature of the Mexican Empire is unclear, as the Viceroyalty of New Spain also exists.

Southern Victory Series by Harry Turtledove
 Maximilian I
 With the War of Secession ending in a Confederate victory in 1862, France and Napoleon III is able to concentrate on intervention in Mexico, winning the war and installing Maximilian I to the throne shortly afterwards. He would serve as the Emperor of Mexico until at least 1880 and his dynasty he founded there would remain in power through the Second Great War, relying on France and the Confederacy for protection from the wrath of the United States. Maximilian's installation was a violation of the Monroe Doctrine. The French and Confederates prevented the US from enforcing the doctrine, thus effectively shooting it between the eyes.
 Maximilian II
 He had served as the Emperor of Mexico since at least 1880. He maintained the close ties between his country and France. In 1881, with his nation desperate for money, Maximilian decided to sell the Mexican states of Chihuahua and Sonora to the Confederate States, which would cause the Second Mexican War with the United States.
 Francisco José I
 He served as the Emperor of Mexico after Maximilian II. During his reign as emperor, he saw Mexico enter the Great War on the side of the Entente Powers with the Confederate States, the United Kingdom, France, and Russia.
 Maximilian III
 He served as the Emperor of Mexico after Francisco Jose I. During his reign as emperor during the late 1910s and early 1920s, anti-Habsburg revolutionaries sought to remove him from the throne and sparked the Mexican Civil War in 1917. He served as the emperor until at least 1942 and saw the beginning of the Second Great War and Mexico join the Entente Powers once again.
 Francisco José II
 He served as the Emperor of Mexico after Maximilian III and was the emperor during the Second Great War. He reluctantly supplied troops to the Confederacy, who were used to both help attack the United States and later defend the Confederacy from US counter-attacks.
 After U.S. General Irving Morrell's major breakthrough at Pittsburgh came at the expense of poorly-equipped Mexican troops, Francisco Jose II refused to allow his men to participate in any more major battles against the United States. This would result in Mexico losing the Baja California peninsula to the United States. Confederate President Jake Featherston, after unsuccessfully attempting to change the Emperor's mind, finally acquiesced. Mexican troops were instead used to battle the black guerrilla fighters in the southern part of the Confederacy.

Job: A Comedy of Justice by Robert A. Heinlein
 Among the many alternate timelines visited by the protagonists, there is one in which late 20th century Mexico is a monarchy, ruled by a king.

Mongol Empire

Times Without Number by John Brunner
 King Mahendra the White Elephant
 In an alternative history equivalent of the year 1988,  King Mahendra the white elephant is a decadent Indian usurper sitting the throne of a Mongol Empire ruling all Asia and all Europe. Under his rule, Christianity is suppressed. He has in his court a corps of female gladiators, adept at martial arts and archery, who "fight like Hashishin" and who speak a dialect of Chinese different from all those spoken in our reality.

P

Peru

The Emperor's New Groove
 Emperor Kuzco
 He is the young, selfish, and callous ruler of the Inca Empire who loves to dance to the groove every morning but has a sense of style and charm. Kuzco befriends a farmer and llama herder Pacha and eventually learns the meaning of friendship and generosity after he was transformed into a llama by his former advisor and self-proclaimed sorceress Yzma (who attempted to poison him to claim the throne for herself) and her muscular but somewhat dimwitted henchman Kronk Pepikrankenitz. His name is a reference to the ancient city of Cusco.

Portugal

The Alteration by Kingsley Amis
 The unnamed King of Portugal is mentioned as being in attendance at the funeral of Stephen III of England in 1976.

Curious Notions by Harry Turtledove
 In an alternate timeline, Imperial Germany became the dominant world power by 2096, following its victories in the 20th century's three world wars. As result, Germany restored the monarchies of various countries including Portugal. The King of Portugal is among the many monarchs annually attending the Kaiser in Berlin, in a glittering ceremony broadcast live worldwide.

R

Russia and the Russian Empire

The Alteration by Kingsley Amis
 The novel is set in an alternate 1976. The Crown Prince of Muscovy is mentioned as being in attendance at the funeral of King Stephen III of England.

Anastasia
 Marie Feodorovna Romanov is the Dowager Empress of Imperial Russia, who managed to escaped from the evil Rasputin during the Russian Revolution. But during the escape, she inadvertently left behind her youngest granddaughter, Grand Duchess Anastasia, who suffered amnesia as the result of a head injury.
 Tsar Nicholas II Romanov was the last monarch of Imperial Russia and the father of Grand Duchess Anastasia. Rasputin placed a curse on Nicholas's royal family, sparking the Russian Revolution.

And Having Writ... by Donald R. Bensen
 Nicholas II
 Nicholas II meets up with the four alien explorers Raf, Ari, Valmis and Dark at Tsarskoe Selo in 1909. After his son Alexi falls and strikes his head on a desk, the aliens and the Tsar discuss the czarevitch's haemophilia and after a finding out that his son lacks the protein in his blood and that he has the protein, agrees to a blood transfusion with the help of Dark's machine. His son is cured within three days and results in nationwide rejoicing at this news and Grigori Rasputin is thrown out the Palace by Imperial soldiers. Czar Nicholas is so boundlessly thankful for the aliens deed and arranges safe passage to Spain for the Explorers, who are still being pursued by American Marines. In addition, the Czar promises to seriously consider everything that Ari has told him about the possibility of a World War. However, with either World War I or the Russian Revolution occurring, Nicholas remained on the Russian throne until between 1918 and 1933.
 Alexei Nikolaevich, Tsarevich of Russia
 With his Haemophilia cured in 1909, Alexei grows up a healthy person. He succeed the Russian throne by 1933. During their 1933 tour of Earth, which the four alien explorers undertake just prior to their departure from Earth, they are received by Alexei, who is now the Czar of Russia. During the encounter, Raf describes him as a "strapping young lad."

Back in the USSA by Eugene Byrne and Kim Newman
 Nicholas III is the Russian Tsar in 1972 as depicted in Abdication Street. His daughter Duchess Ekaterina is intended to marry Charles, Duke of Cornwall, the great-nephew and heir apparent of Edward VIII.

The Peshawar Lancers by S. M. Stirling
 Grand Duke Nikolai is the de facto tsar of the Russian Empire in 2025. By the alternate 2025 of the novel, the Empire is centered around Samarkand and has adopted regressive religious practices such as ritualistic cannibalism and worship of Chernobog.

Southern Victory Series by Harry Turtledove
 Nicholas II
 In 1914, when Austria-Hungary issued a number of ultimata to Serbia following the assassination of Franz Ferdinand by a Serb in Sarajevo, Nicholas II promised to support the Serbs should they refuse the ultimata. They did, and Russia declared war on Austria-Hungary, which had declared war on Serbia. The Great War followed. In 1917, Nicholas found himself facing a Red revolution, followed by a protracted civil war, which resulted in Russia backing out of the Great War. Ultimately, Nicholas and his supporters triumphed, and Nicholas remained emperor for the remainder of the 1920s and died in the early 1930s. The destruction resulting from the wars left Russia in such a poor state that in 1929 she was forced to suspend payment of a loan to Austria-Hungary. This caused a chain effect that led in turn to the worldwide stock market crash of that year. Following his death, Nicholas was succeeded as Tsar by his younger brother Michael II.
 Michael II
 The Grand Duke succeeds his older brother Nicholas II as the Tsar of Russia sometime in the early 1930s, reigning until the end of the Second Great War when he is forced to pursue an armistice with the Central Powers and to relinquish the throne after a German superbomb is dropped on Petrograd.

What Might Have Been
 Constantine I
 In the story What If Napoleon Triumphs In Russia by Adam Zamoyski, after the French Empire's victory over Russia and Alexander I's flight from Pskov to a remote monastery, Grand Duke Constantine was installed by Napoleon as Tsar on 15 August 1813. Tsar Constantine I was considered a weak leader, being forced to relinquish the Baltic territories, return Finland to Sweden and to send Russian troops to help France fight in Spain. Constantine faced a peasant's revolt led by a false pretender claiming to be Alexander I but was ultimately assassinated in 1827, replaced by his younger brother Nicholas.

Y: The Last Man by Brian K. Vaughan and Pia Guerra
 Vladimir Jr.
 In the comic book series, all mammals with a Y chromosome with the exception of amateur escape artist Yorick Brown and his Capuchin monkey, Ampersand died in an unexplained cataclysm on 17 July 2002. Vladimir Jr., the son of Russian astronauts Ciba Weber and Vladimir conceived on the International Space Station, is the only other living male on Earth, having been born after the cataclysm. In the final issue Alas (#60), set six decades after the main tenure of the series, it is revealed that Vladimir became the Czar of Russia, by which time a cis-male population is re-established, albeit limited to thousands worldwide and consisting of clones of Yorick and men who died in the cataclysm.

S

Spain

Bring the Jubilee by Ward Moore
 In an alternate timeline where the Confederate States won the 'War of Southern Independence', one consequence is the revitalization of the Spanish Empire consisting of the Spanish West Indies, the Spanish East Indies and Spanish Africa (all of mainland Latin America being annexed by the Confederacy) and allied to the German Union. The terrorist organization, the Grand Army, attempted to spare the United States from an inevitable war between the Confederacy and the German Union by counterfeiting Spanish currency. An unnamed King is mentioned as ruling during the 1950s by an official investigating this.

Pirates of the Caribbean: On Stranger Tides
 King Ferdinand VI rules Spain from his palace in Cádiz. He sends his most trusted Spanish agent called the Spaniard to find and destroy the Fountain of Youth.

Times Without Number by John Brunner
 Philip IX
 In an alternative timeline where the Spanish Armada successfully invaded England in 1588, the 'Western Empire' (the successor to the Spanish Empire) encompasses France, England, the Spanish Netherlands, South America and Central America with a loose protectorate over a Mohawk-controlled North America; however, the Iberian Peninsula was turned into a 'New Khalifate' by Islamic invaders, forcing the relocation of the center of the Spanish Empire to Londres. In one of the book's episodes, the King and the entire Royal Family are killed by female warriors, masters of Martial arts, which were unwisely brought in from an Alternate History timeline; however, the book's time-traveling protagonist manages to change history and avert the disaster.

The Two Georges by Harry Turtledove and Richard Dreyfuss
 In an alternate reality where American Revolution never occurred and British America remained within the British Empire, a personal union comprising the French and Spanish empires called the Holy Alliance is the British Empire's main rival; the Holy Alliance is dominated by its French half, ruled by François IV.

Sweden

What Might Have Been
 Joseph I
 In the story What If Napoleon Triumphs In Russia by Adam Zamoyski, after the French Empire's victory over Russia, Napoleon returned Finland to Sweden and installed Józef Poniatowski as King. Jean-Baptiste Jules Bernadotte is executed for treason against France.

T

Thailand/Siam

The King and I
 King Mongkut is the sovereign of Siam who is resided in the Grand Palace in Bangkok with his son Prince Chulalongkorn and other young royal children. Mongkut takes his request to British schoolteacher Anna Leonowens to tutor his children.

Turkey and the Ottoman Empire

The Alteration by Kingsley Amis
 An unnamed Sultan-Calif of Turkey is mentioned with the Ottoman Empire surviving well into the 20th century and still controlling vast amounts of territory including the Balkans.

Indiana Jones and the Last Crusade
 The Nazi expedition searching for the Holy Grail is shown to have been equipped by an unnamed Sultan of Hatay, in exchange for a Rolls-Royce Phantom II. The fictionalized Hatay monarchy is stated as being a "Republic" in the film.

The Ottoman Republic
 Osman VII – The Ottoman Empire (known as the Ottoman Republic in the film) remains intact into the 21st century as a result of Mustafa Kemal Atatürk falling into a coma when he was seven years old and the Turkish War of Independence never happening as a result. Osman VII is little more than a figurehead and a source of ridicule by foreign dignitaries.

The Peshawar Lancers by S. M. Stirling
 Al-Hussein is the ruler of the Caliphate of Damascus and the Caliph of Islam in the post-Fall world. The Caliphate is an Arab empire encompassing the former Ottoman Empire, the Balkans and Persia, born out of Arab revolts against the Ottoman Empire in the immediate aftermath of the Fall. It is the main rival of France-outre-mer and is the chief obstacle to the formation of an Anglo-French condominium over the Sultanate of Egypt.

Curious Notions by Harry Turtledove

 In an alternate timeline, Imperial Germany became the dominant world power by 2096, following its victories in the 20th century's three world wars. The Ottoman Empire, having been Germany's loyal ally, survived to the end of the 21st century when the book's plot takes place, and probably beyond - though clearly subservient to Germany; the Germans prop up its government as they do with numerous other monarchies throughout the world. The Ottoman Sultan is among the many monarchs annually attending the Kaiser in Berlin, in a glittering ceremony broadcast live worldwide.

U

The United Kingdom, England, Scotland and Ireland

2525
 George VII – Whilst a downsized British Royal Family (a couple living in a two bedroom flat in Tooting) recall the gradual decline of their family and the United Kingdom, they recall George VII seceding Earl's Court to Australia as one of the many secessions which broke up the country.

A Certain Magical Index
 Queen Elizard – Debuted in the 17th light novel volume of the series. She is nearly deposed by her daughter, Princess Carissa, in a coup d'état with the Knights of England but managed to escape. She later used a magical artifact to help weaken her rebellious daughter and empower all of the peoples of the United Kingdom in the final battle against her in Buckingham Palace.

Arthur C. Clarke stories
 King Henry IX, in the short story "Refugee", is still the Prince of Wales when Britain's first spaceport opens in Salisbury Plain. He stows away in a space freighter heading to Mars.

Anno Domini 2000, or, Woman's Destiny by Sir Julius Vogel
 Emperor Albert is the ruler of the Federated British Empire. He falls in love with and marries the Imperial Prime Minister Hilda Fitzherbert and becomes ruler of the former United States after a war sparked by his refusal to marry the President's daughter. Emperor Albert and Empress Hilda's views on royal primogeniture are ironically reversed by their views of their daughter and son.

Anno Dracula series by Kim Newman
 Dracula, who defeats his adversaries, marries Queen Victoria, and seizes control of Britain in Anno Dracula. He becomes first Prince Consort, and subsequently Lord Protector.
King Victor I in The Bloody Red Baron. The King is the real life Prince Albert Victor, Duke of Clarence and Avondale, Queen Victoria's grandson and the second in the line of succession to the British throne from his birth in 1864 until his death in 1892.

Another Case of Milton Jones
 Milton I, King of Middle England, played by Milton Jones. After accidentally leading a cavalry division over Tower Bridge (a treasonable offence) and fleeing London, Milton Jones briefly becomes King of Middle England due to his command over grammar and pronunciation in his former capacity as a royal speech therapist. He is captured after an uneventful war between the United Kingdom and Middle England and sentenced to death for treason, but is pardoned by the Queen after he cures Prince Herbert of his working class speech patterns by using rocket salad.

The Avengers
 Queen Anne II
 In The Avengers episode "Esprit de Corps", a Jacobitist coup against the British Government attempts to install Cathy Gale as Queen.

Blackadder
 Richard IV of England (and XII of Scotland), a fictionalized version of Richard of Shrewsbury, Duke of York (one of the Princes in the Tower), played by Brian Blessed. He reigned from 1485 to 1498, succeeding his 'kind and thoughtful' uncle, Richard III. However, Henry Tudor erased Richard IV's reign, the Yorkist victory during the Wars of the Roses and Richard III's true nature from history after his belated succession to the throne.
 Edmund the Blackadder, Richard IV's second son and the Duke of Edinburgh. He began a campaign to become King after being told by three witches that he would so (having been mistaken for Henry Tudor). After being mortally wounded from torture, he rules as King for thirty seconds after the entire court accidentally drank poisoned wine (which the Blackadder also drank).
 Prince Ludwig the Indestructible, played by Hugh Laurie, killed Queen Elizabeth I and her court, which included Lord Blackadder, Lord Melchett, Lord Percy and Nursie, and disguised himself as the Queen, presumably continuing until the Queen's official death.
 When Edmund Blackadder Esq. and George, the Prince Regent swap identities in order to get the latter out of a duel with the Duke of Wellington, Blackadder is saved by a cigarillo case presented by Wellington as a gift and the Prince Regent is shot by Wellington for impertinence when he reveals the ruse. The Prince Regent dies (although he first believed that he himself was saved by a cigarillo case but realized that he left it on the dresser) and Blackadder goes on to reign as George IV after George III mistakes him for his son.
 Edmund III of the United Kingdom, played by Rowan Atkinson, became king in Blackadder: Back & Forth after using a time machine to alter history. He is married to Queen Marian of Sherwood and has installed Baldrick as a puppet prime minister after dissolving Parliament.

Books by William F. Buckley Jr.
 In the 1976 novel Saving the Queen, Queen Caroline ascended the throne in 1951.

Books by Joan Aiken
 James III of the United Kingdom (part of a House of Stuart dynasty which was not overthrown)
 King in Joan Aiken's Black Hearts in Battersea
 Richard IV of the United Kingdom
 King in The Cuckoo Tree and Dido and Pa, Son of James III - he also appears as David Prince of Wales in The Whispering Mountain

Books by Kingsley Amis
 Stephen II
 Son of Arthur, Prince of Wales (d. 1502) and Katherine of Aragon.
 His existence led his uncle Henry the Abominable to try to usurp the throne, but was foiled in the War of the English Succession.
 Presumably, Stephen III and William V are his descendants.
 Thereafter, King in The Alteration by Kingsley Amis.
 Stephen III of England
 King in The Alteration by Kingsley Amis. Having died before the start of the novel, it opens with his state funeral at the St George Basilica at Coverley, the ecclesiastical capital of England (superseding the secular capital in London) and the sight of the Holy Victory in the War of the English Succession.
 He was presumably married to Winifred, mentioned as being the Queen Mother.
 William V of England
 King in The Alteration by Kingsley Amis
 Son of Stephen III
 Henry IX of England
 King in The Man In The High Castle by Philip K. Dick, the novel-within-a-novel depicting an alternate universe.
 The real-life Henry, Duke of Cornwall, the son of Henry VIII and Catherine of Aragon. In the novel-within-a-novel, he continues his father's Schismatic religious policies.
 Elizabeth Tudor of England
 Queen in Galliard by Keith Roberts (a pastiche of his novel Pavane), a novel-within-a-novel depicted in The Alteration by Kingsley Amis.
 In Galliard, she is kidnapped and indoctrinated with Schismatic theology.

Books by A. Bertram Chandler
 The coronation of James XIV of the Jacobite Kingdom of Waverley is mentioned in one of Chandler's stories, described as a ceremony of great pomp and broadcast throughout the human-settled galaxy.

Books by Peter Dickinson
 Victor I, the historic Albert Victor, Duke of Clarence and Avondale, survives the influenza pandemic in 1892 and goes on to marry his prospective bride Mary of Teck (as detailed in the preamble of King and Joker).
 Victor II, the grandson of Victor I and Queen Mary. Despite being a qualified physician, the British Government prevents him from practicing medicine over fears of lawsuits. He is secretly  married bigamously to Isabella, the Queen Consort and her secretary, Anona Fellowes, the latter being Princess Louise's birth mother.

Books by Michael Moorcock
 Gloriana I of Albion is the reigning monarch in Gloriana, or the Unfullfill'd Queen. She is Moorcock's antithesis of Queen Elizabeth I in this homage to Edmund Spenser's The Faerie Queene and Mervyn Peake's Gormenghast trilogy of novels.
 King Hern VI of Albion is Gloriana I's father, a despot with echoes of Elizabeth I's father, King Henry VIII (deceased before Moorcock's novel opens).

Books by Harry Turtledove
 Henry IX of the United Kingdom is the reigning monarch in In the Presence of Mine Enemies, an alternate history wherein the Axis won World War II. While the king has very little direct power (the Nazis having annexed the UK), he is able to affect the politics of his country, namely voicing his support for greater democracy within the Greater German Reich, which is the policy position of the leadership of the governing British Union of Fascists including Prime Minister Charles Lynton. His lineage is never addressed. The book mentions the Union of South Africa as an independent ally of the Reich which continues to practice Apartheid although it is unclear whether Henry IX is also the King of South Africa.
 Charles III of the United Kingdom in The Two Georges, coauthored with Richard Dreyfus. While the character is described as being quite physically similar to the then-real-life Prince of Wales, the fictional Charles III is actually descended from Edward VIII. After the novel's protagonists, Thomas Bushell and Samuel Stanley of the Royal American Mounted Police, save King Charles from two assassination attempts by the nativist, separatist terrorist organisation the Sons of Liberty, he knights them as Members of the Order of the Two Georges for their services.
 Edward VIII was able to retain his throne for much longer in both The Two Georges and the Southern Victory Series.
 Edward IX is mentioned in The Two Georges as having reigned sometime in the 1970s, probably being the son of Edward VIII and the father or brother of Charles III.

Books by John Whitbourn
John Whitbourn had written several books set in a 'Catholic universe'.

 Mary, Queen of Scots became Mary II of England following the death of Elizabeth I due to smallpox in 1562
 James I and VI
 Charles I 'the Victor', who won the English Civil War against Parliament
 James 'the True'
 Charles III, whose reign during the nineteen century saw the prevention of a United Kingdom encompassing the whole of the British Isles through two Anglo-Scottish War
 Joseph the Wizard
 Peter the Brave
 Charles IV, King of England and Wales, Protector of Cornwall and Scilly

Bring the Jubilee by Ward Moore
 William V is mentioned in passing as being king sometime during the first half of the twentieth century.

Carolus Rex series by Andre Norton and Rosemary Edghill
 Charles III: On his deathbed Charles II confirms The Duke of Monmouth as his legitimate heir, avoiding Monmouth's Rebellion, the excesses of James II and the Glorious Revolution
 Charles IV
 James II
 Charles V
 Henry IX: King of the Great Britain as of 1805, the year the book is set in, and the great-great-grandson of Charles III.

Cars 2
Queen Elizabeth II is a classic Rolls-Royce Phantom car who watches the race from Buckingham Palace with her grandson Prince Wheeliam.

Chrestomanci series of books by Diana Wynne Jones
 In Charmed Life, Cat Chant tells Janet Chant that the king is Charles VII.

Code Geass: Lelouch of the Rebellion
 Charles zi Britannia
 The 98th Emperor of the Holy Britannia Empire and father of main character, Lelouch Lamperouge. He installs his children in important positions in the Empire to see their true abilities. He views equality as an evil that must be dispelled and encourages social battle to maintain evolution within the society. As such, he publicly supports inequality and calls for competition and fighting so as to create progress.
 Lelouch vi Britannia
 The 99th Emperor of the Holy Britannia Empire, as well as the titular character of series. When Lelouch ascended to the throne during, he quickly abolished many policies that grew during the Charles' reign. These include the abolishment of aristocratic system, financial conglomerates, and the liberation of colonies. This led to discontent, and thus, agents and loyalist to Emperor Lelouch routinely goes and put down dissidents.

Columbia & Britannia by Adam Chamberlain and Brian A. Dixon
 George V, the fictional second-eldest son of Queen Victoria.
 Edward VII is the eldest son of George V, analogous with Edward VIII. His relationship with his Québécois mistress Cynthia Grey and the resulting scandals almost result in him being forced to abdicate the throne. He retains the throne through a compromise stating that he and Grey should neither marry nor produce any children, the latter clause being broken by the births of their two (untitled) sons. Reigning from 1913 to 1918, he died heirless from acute pancreatitis.
 George VI is the second eldest son of George V and the brother of Edward VII, analogous with the real-life George VI. He reigned from 1918 to 1953, overseeing Britain's effort in the War of Wars (1933–1943).
 Elizabeth II is the eldest daughter of George VI, analogous with the real-life Elizabeth II. Reigning from 1953 to 1963, she was assassinated by an American separatist whilst visiting New York City during a walkabout.
 George VII is the only child of Elizabeth II. After his mother's assassination, he becomes King at the age of five; Princess Margaret, Elizabeth II's sister, acts as Regent to George VII until his coronation on his eighteenth birthday in 1976. A withdrawn and private figure, his public popularity is maintained due to sympathy regarding the conditions of his succession. He reigned from 1963.

Doctor Who
 Queen Liz 10 – Played by Sophie Okenedo, Elizabeth X is the ruler of the Starship UK in "The Beast Below", referring to herself and her predecessors by their abbreviated name and number. 
 Henry XII - Mentioned by Liz 10 as having the Doctor as a drinking buddy in The Beast Below.
 The Night and the Doctor mini-series episode "Bad Night" features an unspecified Queen and Prince of Wales, the former appearing in the form of a goldfish and the latter speaking to the Eleventh Doctor and Amy Pond over the TARDIS telephone. The Doctor attempts to have the Queen restored to her human form but the hostage (in the form of a fly) he was hoping to exchange in order to achieve this is accidentally killed after Amy swatted it with a newspaper and the goldfish he picked up is not in fact the transmogrified Queen. The Commonwealth of Nations was mentioned as a contemporary institution.

The Emberverse series by S. M. Stirling
In the apocalyptic series that begins with Dies the Fire, some of the British Royal Family are evacuated to the Isle of Wight.
 Elizabeth II
 The Queen fled to the Isle of Wight with the rest of the British Royal Family on the third day after The Change occurred. However, she died shortly thereafter in December 1998.
Charles III the Mad
 The real-life Charles III (the Prince of Wales at time of publication). He ascended the British throne following the death of his mother Elizabeth II in December 1998, Charles led the remnants of Britain through the early years after the Change. His knowledge of organic farming (which he had been experimenting with since the early 1980s) helped the survivors with their food problems. He later married an Icelandic refugee, who was popularly blamed for manipulating him. In his later years he went insane and refused to have new elections for parliament and instead ruled by royal decree, which eventually caused a rift between him and Nigel. After about a decade on the throne, he officially died in 2008 of a stroke but it was a common rumor that he was killed by his wife who wanted to assume power for herself and her infant son.
 William V the Great
 The real-life Prince of Wales. He became the King of Great Britain and Emperor of the West following the death of his father and after defeating a coup by his stepmother. After the Change occurred in 1998, William went to serve in the military. Nigel saved his life in a battle with pirates during this service. He personally led a "crusade" against Moorish pirates off the Canary Islands and on his return was crowned Emperor of the West. Under his leadership the British Empire was reborn. He tried unsuccessfully to convince Nigel to return to Britain by promising him wealth, land, and title. He would serve as king from 2008 until his death in a fox-hunting accident in 2039.
 Charles IV
 Fictional son of William V. Served as King of Great Britain and Emperor of the West from 2039 until his death in 2066. 
 Elizabeth III
 Daughter of Charles IV. Served as the Queen of Great Britain and Empress of the West from 2066 to 2098.

Futurama
 In the episode "All the Presidents' Heads", an unnamed Queen of Great Britain, North America (also called 'West Britannia') and 'two parking spaces in Tokyo' reigns in the 31st century due to the Planet Express crew accidentally preventing the American Revolution whilst trying to prevent counterfeiting by Professor Farnsworth's ancestor David Farnsworth. The Queen is descended from the Farnsworth family due to their elevation to a ducal family with its members providing consorts for the Royal Family.

The Gate of Worlds by Robert Silverberg
 James the Valiant - the Black Death, much worse than in our history, so weakened Europe that the entire continent was conquered by the Ottoman Empire. In the 20th century, the freedom fighter James made use of a period of Ottoman instability, led a successful rebellion, liberated England after five centuries of Turkish rule and inaugurated a new Royal Dynasty. English people were happy and proud of James the Valiant's achievement - though the independent England was an impoverished country, of little account in the wider world.

The Great Mouse Detective
 Queen Mousetoria is the mouse queen of England who has been deposed by the evil Professor Ratigan but gets rescued by Basil of Baker Street and Dr. Dawson.
 Professor Padraic Ratigan attempts to conquer England as a "supreme ruler of all Mousedom" with his toy robot that mimics the real Queen declaring it.

Headlong by Emlyn Williams
 John II: The actor Jack Green (born John Albert Sandring), who is grandson of Prince Albert Victor and made king after the royal family is killed in a dirigible accident during George V's Silver Jubilee in 1935.
 William V: Originally William Millingham, is the private secretary of John II, and as another descendant of royalty, becomes the new king after John's abdication.
 John III: The son of William V and Anne, the Queen Consort. John III is his suggested regnal name, being only the ten-year-old Prince of Wales in the story.

Henry IX
 In the 2017 TV series Henry IX, Henry IX of the United Kingdom is played by Charles Edwards. After his older brother John died in a horse riding accident, Henry became heir apparent to the British throne, becoming King in 1992. After nearly twenty-five years on the throne, he experiences a midlife crisis (owing to his lack of agency both in becoming and being King, his unhappy marriage and a monotonous series of trivial public engagements) and intends to abdicate during his Silver Jubilee. Queen Katarina (played by Sally Phillips) stymies his plan by clandestinely leaking it to the press, wishing to remain Queen. After Alastair, the Prince of Wales, comes out as gay and creates a succession crisis (since no one other than the homophobic Duke of Cumberland would willingly become monarch), Henry IX retains the throne. However, almost immediately, his secret relationship with the royal florist is uncovered by the tabloid press.

Her Majesty's American by Steve White
 Maurice I: The only son of William III and Mary II, he becomes king at the age of thirteen in 1702, born one year after the Glorious Revolution. His birth and reign ensures that British monarchs would concurrently hold the title of Stadtholder of the Dutch Republic.
 William V: His reign saw the outbreak of the First American Rebellion in 1775 with rapprochement bringing about the creation of the Viceroyalty of North America in 1781.
 Maurice II: Mentioned as being king sometime during the early-nineteenth century.
 William VII: Adopts the titles Emperor of North America and Emperor of India following the Second American Rebellion and the Great Mutiny respectively.
 Elizabeth IV: The namesake of a Regal Lines interstellar passenger liner.

House of Cards
 In the British political satire To Play the King, the second book (and TV series) in the House of Cards trilogy by Michael Dobbs, an unnamed King takes the throne. Critical of the Conservative government's social policies, he goes up against the utterly ruthless and unscrupulous Prime Minister Francis Urquhart as an unofficial leader of the opposition but is ultimately undone and forced to abdicate. The novel diverges in many ways from the TV series and carries the suggestion that after abdicating the ex-King would go into politics and seek to be elected Prime Minister. At the end of To Play The King, the King's son is crowned and during The Final Cut is depicted performing monarchical duties.

Hyperion Cantos by Dan Simmons
 William XXIII of the Kingdom of Windsor-in-Exile
 Also called "Sad King Billy"
 King on Asquith, a planet traditionally held by his kingdom
 Sells Asquith in order to settle on the planet Hyperion, where he intends to revive fine art, taking Martin Silenus with him.

If: A Jacobite Fantasy by Charles Petrie
 James III of England and VIII of Scotland - The Jacobite rising of 1745, led by Charles Edward Stuart, succeeded in restoring the House of Stuart to the British throne. In February 1746, his father arrived in London to officially take the throne. In 1752, he granted clemency to the Hanoverian rebels. By 1926, the House of Hanover's usurpation of the throne was viewed as "an interlude in the national life, but it was one that will not have been without its purpose if it is regarded as a lesson upon the consequences of rebellion."
 Charles III of England and Scotland: James III's eldest son. Charles III allied himself with Frederick II of Prussia and, together, they "towered over the other rulers of Europe like colossi" from 1766 until Frederick's death in 1786. During his reign, the colonies in British North America rebelled against Great Britain but a diplomatic solution was reached. Charles III was credited with saving the situation by his witty remark to George Washington, who went on to become one of Britain's greatest generals, and his colleagues: "Gentlemen, we have one thing in common: my family have no more cause to like the House of Commons than you have." 
 Henry IX of England and I of Scotland: James III's second son. As Duke of York, his patronage helped ensure the flourishing of literature and art in Britain and this policy continued after he came to the throne as Henry IX. After the French Revolution drove the deposed Electors of Hanover into exile in 1789, he gave them a "generous pension."
 James IV of England and IX of Scotland, presumably the son of Henry IX and I
 James V of England and X of Scotland
 James VI of England and XI of Scotland was the reigning monarch in 1926.

In the Cage Where Your Saviours Hide by Malcolm Mackay
 In an alternate reality where the Darien scheme was successful, Scotland remained an independent country with its own colony of Caledonia in Central America. Kenneth IV was mentioned as the King of Scotland in 1905, conducting a royal visit to Caledonia during mounting calls for independence.

Infinite Worlds
 William III of England (in the 12th rather than the 17th Century)
 Unbroken Plantagenet Monarchs until the 19th Century.
In the  GURPS role-playing game Infinite Worlds, in the year 1120 the White Ship carrying William the Aetheling, the heir of Henry I of England, did not hit a rock in the English Channel. William survived the voyage and eventually assumed the throne - becoming known as William III of England. Neither the Empress Matilda nor Stephen of Blois had any claim on the throne. William's descendants constituted more than seven centuries of English monarchs, with the House of Plantagenet retaining unbroken power. Ultimately the "Anglo-French Empire" became a world-spanning power, achieving an Industrial Revolution much earlier. However, in 1902 unknown parties detonated a nuclear device, destroying the royal family.

Johnny English
King Pascal I of the United Kingdom: Played by John Malkovich, Sauvage is a French private prison entrepreneur who engineered his accession to the British throne in order to convert the entire United Kingdom into a giant prison facility. 
Johnny English: Played by Rowan Atkinson, he was accidentally crowned king. Abdicating after one day in favour of Queen Elizabeth II, English exchanged the throne for a knighthood.

King Ralph
 Wyndham Family, the ruling House of the United Kingdom in the film, who are all electrocuted to death in a photography accident.
 Ralph I of the United Kingdom, played by John Goodman, was an American lounge singer who came to the throne following the Wyndham family's demise. One of the Wyndham princes had an affair with an American woman, which resulted in the birth of a son, who was Ralph's father.
 Cedric I of the United Kingdom, played by Peter O'Toole, took power after Ralph I abdicated the throne.

The Last Man by Mary Shelley
 Adrian, Earl of Windsor: In a post-apocalyptic 21st century, Britain is a republic with a Lord Protector as head of state where Adrian, the son of the last king and heir to the British throne, embraces republican principles.

The League of Extraordinary Gentlemen
 Nan Bollen
 Gloriana I
 Jacob I
 Gloriana II

Long Live The King by John Rowe
 Queen Victoria II, the reigning monarch of the United Kingdom during the 1980s, and married to Prince Arthur. She is forced to abdicate as a result of leukaemia and consequent chemotherapy. She might be a stand-in for the real-life Elizabeth II, as both Edward VIII and George VI are mentioned as past monarchs. 
 King Richard IV, first son of Victoria II, and married to Queen Fiona Warwick. He became king after Victoria II abdicated, but was assassinated not long after along with his consort and parents by the Provisional IRA.
 King George VII, second son of Victoria II, and married to Anne Kitchener. His first son is Prince David Arthur Rupert George, nicknamed Prince DARG.

Lord Darcy novels
 John IV of the Anglo-French Empire
 King in the Lord Darcy novels by Randall Garrett
 Descendant of Richard I Plantagenet, who survived the siege of Chalus in 1199 in this series.
 Arthur I
 In the history of the same timeline Arthur I, Duke of Brittany, Richard I's nephew, got to be King and proved one of the greatest Kings of English history. His reign came to be considered a Golden Age, to the extent that later generations popular imagination confused him with King Arthur of heroic myth. A major achievement of Arthur's time was the beginning of systematic research and codification of magic, which would later become a central aspect of human civilization.

Marvel Comics
 King Britain of Britain, though technically he rules the whole of Europe. He is king in the Earth X setting, and an alternate future version of Captain Britain.

Minions
 King Bob the Minion
 In 2015 animated film Minions, Bob the Minion briefly takes over the crown from Queen Elizabeth II in 1968 after accidentally crashing into the Sword in the Stone and pulling it free. He later abdicates the throne in favor of supervillain Scarlet.
 Scarlet Overkill
 She takes over the throne from Bob the Minion. After her defeat at the end of the film, Elizabeth II reclaims the throne.

The Moon Maid and Moon Men by Edgar Rice Burroughs
Published in the early 1920s, The Moon Maid and The Moon Men envisioned a twentieth century in which "The Great War" would have gone on uninterrupted, though with varying intensity, from 1914 and until 1967 – ending with the total victory of the Anglo-Saxon Powers, Britain and the US, and the complete defeat and surrender of all other powers. Britain and the US thereupon become co-rulers of the planet, London and Washington being the twin planetary capitals and the US President and British Monarch acting as co-rulers, and with the British-American domination of the world imposed by the International Peace Fleet, made up of airships. In the first decades of the 21st century, the world basks in peace, there seems no enemy and no threat anywhere, and pressure grows for complete disarmament and scrapping of the International Peace Fleet. It is the (unnamed) King of Britain who strongly resists this pressure, and due to him half of the Fleet and of the world's armament industries are retained. This is not enough to resist the invasion fleet of the wild Kalkars from the Moon, led by the renegade Earthman Orthis, which suddenly descends on the world in 2050, capturing London and Washington and ranging the world at will. But by the British King's foresight there was still a remnant of the Fleet in existence, which kills the renegade Orthis – facilitating humanity's eventual liberation from Kalkar domination, though only centuries later.

The Napoleon of Notting Hill
 Auberon Quin in The Napoleon of Notting Hill by G. K. Chesterton. In this book the ruler of the United Kingdom is selected randomly from the "official class", which one character describes as "the sane and enduring democracy ... founded on the fact that all men are equally idiotic".

Nation by Terry Pratchett
 After influenza kills the entire British royal family, Governor Fanshaw is the heir to the throne and is sought out in the South Pacific. His daughter Ermentrude Fanshaw ("Daphne") is his heir and succeeds him on the throne and becomes queen.

Old Harry's Game
 Derek I
 Deceased historian Edith Barrington (played by Annette Crosbie) is forced to write a biography of Satan as part of a deal to no longer be billeted with her ex-son-in-law Thomas Crimp, the most vile human ever to have lived. Whilst conducting research for the biography, Edith becomes frustrated with the many revelations that official recorded histories were wildly incorrect. One example is the existence of Derek I, a Tudor monarch forgotten by history. Satan's assistant Scumspawn (played by Robert Duncan) recalls the monarch as 'the mad, black, Catholic lesbian', personally believing that she was undone by her Catholicism.

The Palace
 King James III
 The previous ruler.
 King Richard IV
 Son of James III, played by Rupert Evans.
 Prior to his coronation, his sister Princess Eleanor (played by Sophie Winkleman) attempted unsuccessfully to discredit him in order to claim the throne for herself, being exiled from court after questioning Richard's paternity.

Passport to Pimlico
 Sébastien de Charolais
 The descendant of Charles the Bold, the presumed last Duke of Burgundy, he is installed as the Duke of a revived Burgundy in post-Second World War Pimlico. After becoming a market for off-the-ration goods and being subsequently blockaded (albeit unsuccessfully), Burgundy is readmitted into the United Kingdom.

Pavane by Keith Roberts
 Charles the Good
 In an alternate reality where the assassination of Elizabeth I results in the suppression of Protestantism and the ascendancy of the Catholic Church as a European and world power by the twentieth century, Charles the Good is the King of England and the nominal ruler of the New World. In the story Corfe Gate, a regional rebellion led by Lady Eleanor breaks out during his reign.

The Peshawar Lancers by S. M. Stirling
 Victoria II reigned from 1921 to 1942. Presumably the eldest surviving child of George V, she was hedonistic, intelligent and sexually liberal with most of what defined her reign being whitewashed out of history books. She died unmarried and without issue.
 Albert I, the cousin of Victoria II and a former Professor of Indo-European Languages, reigned from 1942 to 1989.
 Elizabeth II, reigned from 1989 to 2005. She is known as the 'Whig Empress' for pushing for the right for women to study at universities.
 King-Emperor John II is the ruler of the British Empire (Angrezi Raj) in an alternate history set in 2025. He was the second son of Elizabeth II, his older brother Edward having predeceased him. He was killed when the Imperial air yacht Garuda was hijacked and heavily damaged by the captain, a radical Afrikaner nationalist, in collaboration with the Russian Empire.
 Charles III, the son of John II. Reigned from 2025 onwards.

Pirates of the Caribbean: On Stranger Tides
 King George II is a greedy ruler of England who employs Captain Hector Barbossa as a privateer and attempts to order Captain Jack Sparrow to guide an expedition to the Fountain of Youth before King Ferdinand of Spain locates it.

The Prince and the Pauper by Mark Twain
 Henry Tudor VIII was the previous king of England whose obesity hastened his death after the war.
 Edward Tudor is the young prince of Wales who trades places with Thomas Canty, the young pauper, before he is proclaimed to be the new and rightful king of England.

The Puppet Masters

The world is invaded by space parasites, capable of attaching themselves to the body of a human being and completely controlling him or her. The President of the US implements a policy of ordering all Americans to walk naked, as the only way of ensuring they are not controlled by the invaders. The (unnamed) King of Britain wants to follow suit, but is prevented by the strong objections of the Archbishop of Canterbury, leaving Britain in danger of being taken over.

Revolting People
 Samuel I
 While en route to a ball to convince George III to liberalize the governance of the Thirteen Colonies and thus avert the American Revolution, Baltimore shopkeeper Samuel Oliphant (played by Jay Tarses) dreams that he has been appointed by popular demand as King of Great Britain, Ireland and the British Empire 'especially America', acting as an absolutist despot. Samuel's dream ends with his assassination by his firebrand daughter Mary.

The Royals
King Simon Henstridge, played by Vincent Regan, dies in Season 1.
Prince Cyrus Henstridge, Duke of York, played by Jake Maskall, briefly succeeded Simon after his son Robert is thought to have been killed in a plane crash and his twin children Prince Liam and Princess Eleanor were deemed illegitimate.
King Robert Henstridge, played by Max Brown, succeeded his father after revealing himself to be alive.

Sliders
 In the parallel universe featured in the Sliders episode "The Prince of Wails" in which Great Britain won the American Revolutionary War, King Thomas was the reigning monarch of the British Empire until he was killed during the war with France in 1995. 
 Harold III (the uncrowned 'Prince of the Americas' and 'heir to the British throne') succeeded his father Thomas in 1995. He had been targeted in a plot involving a smear campaign and an assassination attempt by the Sheriff of San Francisco (that reality's Maximilian Arturo) to seize the Crown for himself. After being briefly kidnapped by the revolutionary Oakland Raiders, he is made aware of the Sheriff's deception and the true condition of the British States of America. He joins forces with the Raiders and the Sliders to denounce the Sheriff and introduce democracy via the implementation of a 'Second Magna Carta' (a version of the United States Constitution written from memory by the Sliders).

The Tales of Alvin Maker by Orson Scott Card
 As a result of the continued existence of the Commonwealth of England, the exiled House of Stuart establishes the Crown Colonies, a monarchy on the American Eastern seaboard co-existing with a New England Republic and a smaller United States.

The Time Ships
 Egbert I of the United Kingdom
 King in The Time Ships by Stephen Baxter, a sequel to The Time Machine by H.G. Wells.
 Note: The novel's protagonist, visiting an alternate version of the Great War, is surprised to discover that the King is "a skinny chap called Egbert", apparently a distant cousin of the Royal Family who was the most senior survivor of massive German bombing raids early in the conflict.

The Virgin & the Wheels
 David I of the United Kingdom and North America
 King in The Virgin & The Wheels by L. Sprague de Camp.
 His birthday celebrated in New York City, all streets festooned with Union Jacks. New Yorkers regard him fondly as "Our King" and see nothing strange about being under British rule into the mid-20th century. The day's paper told of "His Majesty's visit to a soap factory, where he showed a keen interest in the technical details" and of the launch of the cruise ship Queen Victoria.

V for Vendetta
 Queen Zara of the United Kingdom
 Queen in V for Vendetta (comic book)
 Following a nuclear war in the 1980s, the crown falls to Zara, a 16-year-old queen who serves as a puppet monarch for Adam Susan and his fascist Norsefire party.

Yellow Dog by Martin Amis
 Henry IX
 Richard IV, mentioned as being the father of Henry IX

The United States

American Royals by Katherine McGee
 George I, the historic George Washington who was made the first king, rather than the first president.
 King Jeff, who replaced male-preference primogeniture with absolute primogeniture.
 George IV
 Queen Beatrice, one of the main characters of the novels.

Assassin's Creed
 George Washington in Assassin's Creed III. George Washington is corrupted by an Apple of Eden, turns the Thirteen Colonies into the United Kingdom of America and dubs himself King.

Lois & Clark: The New Adventures of Superman
In an alternate timeline accidentally created by Clark Kent, Lois Lane and H. G. Wells in the episode "Soul Mates", Tempus was the King of America in 1996.

Sliders
In the parallel universe featured in the Sliders episode "The Prince of Tides" in which the United States became a constitutional monarchy, Thomas Jefferson was crowned as the first King of the United States in 1789. His direct descendants continued to reign more than two centuries later. The reigning monarch King Thomas and his sons Benjamin and Tyler were killed in a house fire in 1997, which was later determined to be arson.

Star-Spangled Crown by Charles A. Coulombe
 King James IV of the United States
 Born Hans-Josef II of Lichtenburg
 Conferred authority in the wake of a military coup whose leaders reconstitute the United States as a constitutional monarchy
 Formally "James IV, King of the United States and of their Possessions, Grand Duke of Lichtenberg"

See also
List of monarchs of fictional countries
List of fictional politicians
List of fictional prime ministers of the United Kingdom
List of fictional nobility
List of fictional political parties
Lists of fictional presidents of the United States
List of fictional princes
List of fictional princesses

References

monarchs
fictional monarchs